The Taste of Polonia is a Chicago festival held at the Copernicus Cultural and Civic Center in the Jefferson Park community area of Chicago in Cook County, Illinois, United States every Labor Day weekend since 1980. It is the Copernicus Foundation's major fundraiser and a four-day celebration of Polish cultural heritage, traditions, and customs. The Taste of Polonia features delicious Polish cuisine, entertainment on three stages, as well as numerous Polish handcrafters and artisans.

The festival attracts attendees from Chicago's Northwest Side, the rest of Chicago, and outlying areas in the region. It draws both Chicago's Polish community as well as people of other ethnic backgrounds. Taste of Polonia is the largest ethnic festival in Chicago, drawing crowds between 40,000 and 60,000 each year over the span of four days.

As one of Chicago Polonia's chief festivals, numerous local and national politicians have made it a stop on their campaign trail during the election season. In 1992, the Taste of Polonia was honored by the presence of and hosted by President George H. W. Bush. In 2000, the fest was visited by future Vice President Dick Cheney, Tipper Gore, and Hadassah Lieberman. Former House Speaker Newt Gingrich and his wife Callista came to the festival on September 4, 2011, ahead of the 2012 Republican Party presidential primaries to screen the documentary 9 Days That Changed the World, which the couple coproduced.

No festival was planned in 2020.

References
 1. http://ToPChicago.org

External links
The official website of Taste of Polonia
Sponsored by the Copernicus Center at 

Festivals in Chicago
Polish-American culture in Chicago
Cultural festivals in the United States